The 1828 United States presidential election in Ohio took place between October 31 and December 2, 1828, as part of the 1828 United States presidential election. Voters chose 16 representatives, or electors to the Electoral College, who voted for President and Vice President.

Ohio voted for the Democratic candidate, Andrew Jackson, over the National Republican candidate, John Quincy Adams. Jackson won Ohio by a narrow margin of 3.2%. This was the first election of the Second Party System, and as such the first election in which Ohio voted for a candidate of a party other than the Democratic-Republicans.

Results

See also
 United States presidential elections in Ohio

References

Ohio
1828
1828 Ohio elections